Rekha is an Indian actress who has received several awards and nominations, including a National Film Award and four Filmfare Awards. Hailed as one of India's finest actresses, she made her debut as a child artist in 1966 and went on to appear in lead roles in the early 1970s. Since her debut as a leading actress she has acted in over 180 films. Rekha has often portrayed strong female characters, while also acting in some arthouse films besides numerous mainstream cinema. She has won four Filmfare Awards; two Best Actress awards—resulting from seven nominations, one Best Supporting Actress award—resulting from six nominations, and a Lifetime Achievement Award. The first Best Actress win came in 1981 for the Hrishikesh Mukherjee-directed Khubsoorat where she was cast in a comic role. Her portrayal of a classical courtesan in Umrao Jaan (1981) fetched her the National Film Award for Best Actress in 1982. Rekha received her second Filmfare Award for Best Actress in 1989 for Khoon Bhari Maang. She portrayed the role of a widow who sets out to take revenge on her lover. Her negative role in Khiladiyon Ka Khiladi was highly appreciated by critics and earned her the Filmfare Award for Best Supporting Actress. In 2003, she was presented with the Lifetime Achievement Award. In 2010, Rekha was awarded the Padma Shri, the 4th highest civilian honour in India. Other awards won by her include International Indian Film Academy Awards, Bengal Film Journalists' Association Awards, Star Screen Awards, Zee Cine Awards, Stardust Awards and Bollywood Movie Awards.

National Film Awards
The National Film Awards is the most prominent film award ceremony in India. The Best Actress category was introduced in 1968 and has been presented annually to an actress who has delivered the best performance in a leading role within the Indian film industry.

Filmfare Awards
The Filmfare Awards are given by Filmfare annually for Hindi films. The Best Actress award is given to a female actor who has delivered an outstanding performance in a leading role. The award was first given in 1954.

 Competitive awards

 Honorary Award

International Indian Film Academy Awards

Bengal Film Journalists' Association Awards

Screen Awards

Zee Cine Awards

Stardust Awards

Bollywood Movie Awards

Other awards
 1977: Film World Award for Best Actress, Immaan Dharam.
 1997: Lakme Timeless Beauty Award
 2004: Maha Style Icon of the year.
 2005: Sony Golden Glory Award.
 2006: Idea Zee F Awards - Fashionable Film Star.
 2012: Big Star Eternal Youth Star Award
2018: Lux Golden Rose Awards - Lux Golden Rose Legendary Beauty Award

Honours and recognitions
 1998: Lachhu Maharaj Award for the Best Kathak Dancer in Hindi films.
 2001: Mumbai Academy of the Moving Image, an award for her abiding contribution to Cinema.
 2006: Deenanath Mangeshkar Award.
 2007: Living Legend in the world of entertainment by FICCI.
 2008: "IMPPA (Indian Motion Pictures' Producers Association) Award" for outstanding contribution to Bollywood.
 2009: "Raj Kapoor Pratibha Gaurav Puraskar" by the Government of Maharashtra for outstanding contribution to the Indian cinema.
 2010: She was awarded the Padma Shri, India's fourth highest civilian honour from the Government of India.
2019: ANR National Award for 2018

References

Further reading

Lists of awards received by Indian actor